Guido Carocci (16 September 1851 - 20 September 1916) was an Italian historian of Florence and its historic buildings. He was born and died in the city. He was also director of its National Museum of San Marco and fought the destruction of the city centre by the building works of the Risanamento. He is buried in the Cimitero di Soffiano.

Sources
 G. Carocci, Gli affreschi di Andrea del Castagno nella villa Pandolfini presso Firenze, Bollettino d'Arte, 8, 1907
 G. Carocci, Il Museo di S. Marco di Firenze ed alcuni suoi nuovi acquisti, Bollettino d'Arte, 10, 1911

Italian architectural historians
Directors of museums in Italy
1851 births
1916 deaths
Writers from Florence
History of Florence